Rein Randver (born 24 June 1956 in Lüllemäe) is an Estonian politician. He has been member of X, XII and XIII Riigikogu. 2006-2007 he was Minister of the Environment.

He was a member of People's Union of Estonia.

References

Living people
1956 births
Social Democratic Party (Estonia) politicians
People's Union of Estonia politicians
Members of the Riigikogu, 2003–2007
Members of the Riigikogu, 2011–2015
Members of the Riigikogu, 2015–2019
Environment ministers of Estonia
Recipients of the Order of the White Star, 3rd Class
Estonian University of Life Sciences alumni
People from Valga Parish